Erik Pačinda (born 9 May 1989) is a Slovak international football player who currently plays for FC Košice  as a forward or a winger.

Club career
Pačinda previously played for DAC Dunajská Streda, Košice or Viktoria Plzeň.

International career
Pačinda was first called up to the national team on 13 March 2018, when he was nominated for two fixtures at 2018 King's Cup by his former coach at Košice, Ján Kozák. 
Although he was benched for the first game against UAE (2–1 win), on 25 March 2018 he made his international debut against Thailand. Firstly, in the 34th minute he assisted Róbert Mak, who set the score to 2–0. Later on, in 67th minute Pačinda himself scored with a left-foot shot after receiving a pass from his former team-mate from MFK Košice, Ondrej Duda. Pačinda completed the entire match as a left-winger and contributed to Slovakia's 3–2 victory and second triumph in their second appearance at the King's Cup (the first was in 2004).

International goals
Scores and results list Slovakia's goal tally first.

References

External links
Player profile MFK Košice profile 

1989 births
Living people
Sportspeople from Košice
Slovak footballers
Slovak expatriate footballers
Slovakia international footballers
Association football forwards
SV Horn players
Expatriate footballers in Austria
Slovak expatriate sportspeople in Austria
FC VSS Košice players
Tours FC players
Expatriate footballers in France
Slovak expatriate sportspeople in France
FC DAC 1904 Dunajská Streda players
FC Viktoria Plzeň players
Expatriate footballers in the Czech Republic
Slovak expatriate sportspeople in the Czech Republic
Korona Kielce players
Expatriate footballers in Poland
Slovak expatriate sportspeople in Poland
FC Spartak Trnava players
Slovak Super Liga players
Ligue 2 players
Czech First League players
Ekstraklasa players